Eadburh, also spelled Eadburg, (fl. 787–802) was the daughter of King Offa of Mercia and Queen Cynethryth. She was the wife of King Beorhtric of Wessex, and according to Asser's Life of Alfred the Great she killed her husband by poison while attempting to poison another. She fled to Francia, where she is said to have been offered the chance of marrying Charlemagne, but ruined the opportunity. Instead she was appointed as the abbess of a convent. Here she is said to have fornicated with an English exile. As a result, she was eventually expelled from the monastery and ended her days begging in the streets of Pavia.

Family
Eadburh was the daughter of King Offa and Queen Cynethryth. She was one of  five children, four of them girls; they all witnessed a charter in 787.

Queen
Eadburh married Beorhtric, king of Wessex from 787 to 802, in 789. Offa was then the most powerful king in England, and Beorhtric gained his support as a result of the marriage. According to Asser, Eadburh became all powerful, and often demanded the executions or exile of her enemies. She was also alleged to have assassinated those men whom she couldn't compel Beorhtric to kill through poisoning their food or drink. In 802, according to Asser, Eadburh attempted to poison a young favourite of the king but instead killed both of them. The young man may have been called Worr, as the Anglo-Saxon Chronicle records the death of both men shortly before the succession of Egbert, the grandfather of Alfred the Great, as king of Wessex.

Exile

Eadburg subsequently fled to Francia and took refuge at the court of Charlemagne, where her husband's successor, Egbert of Wessex, had taken refuge after being exiled by Beorhtric. There Asser relates that Charlemagne was smitten by the former queen. He brought in one of his sons and asked her which she preferred, him or his son, as a husband. She answered that, given the son's youth, she preferred the son. Charlemagne replied famously: "Had you chosen me, you would have had both of us. But, since you chose him, you shall have neither." He instead offered her a position as an abbess of a convent which she accepted.

Soon though she was caught in a sexual affair with another Saxon man and, after being duly convicted, was expelled on the direct orders of Charlemagne, penniless, into the streets. In her last years she lived as a beggar on the streets of Pavia.

Aftermath and legacy
Two possibly authentic charters of 801 show Eadburh as regina (queen), a title which was rarely used for king's wives in Wessex in the ninth century. According to Asser this was because of the shame Eadburh had brought on the position. However, Offa and Beorhtric had driven Egbert into exile in the 780s, and the blackening of her name may also have been partly due to a desire to discredit Beorhtric.

Asser also writes that as a result of the aristocracy's resentment of Eadburh the status and influence of the subsequent queens was diminished and they were titled not 'queen' but 'king's wife'; the queen was also prohibited from sitting beside the king on the throne. This changed again when Charles the Bald insisted that his daughter Judith, who married King Æthelwulf, be properly crowned queen.

Citations

Further reading

Keynes, Simon & Lapidge, Michael (eds & trans), Alfred the Great. Asser's Life of King Alfred and Other Contemporary Sources. London: Penguin, 1983. 
Kirby, D.P., The Earliest English Kings. London: Unwin Hyman, 1991. 

Stafford, Pauline, "Succession and inheritance: a gendered perspective on Alfred's family history" in Gender, Family and the Legitimation of Power: England from the Ninth to the early Twelfth Century. Aldershot: Ashgate, 2006. 
Story, Joanna, Carolingian Connections: Anglo-Saxon England and Carolingian Francia, c. 750–870. Aldershot: Ashgate, 2003. 

8th-century English people
9th-century English people
Anglo-Saxon royal consorts
Beggars
8th-century births
9th-century deaths
House of Icel